is a passenger railway station in the town of Kashima, Ibaraki Prefecture, Japan operated by the third sector Kashima Rinkai Railway. 

The station was originally tied with Minamiaso Mizu-no-Umareru-Sato Hakusui-Kōgen Station in Kumamoto Prefecture for the longest train station name in Japan, with 22 hiragana characters each, until both were surpassed by Tōjiin Ritsumeikan University Station in Kyoto in 2020.

Lines
Chōjagahamashiosaihamanasukōenmae Station is served by the Ōarai Kashima Line, and is located 48.4 km from the official starting point of the line at Mito Station.

Station layout
The station consists of one elevated side platform, serving traffic in both directions. There is no station building and the station is unattended.

History
Chōjagahamashiosaihamanasukōenmae Station was opened on 11 November 1990.

Passenger statistics
In fiscal 2015, the station was used by an average of 63 passengers daily.

Surrounding area
 
Shiosai Hamanasu Park

See also
 List of railway stations in Japan

References

External links

 Kashima Rinkai Testudo Station Information 

Railway stations in Ibaraki Prefecture
Railway stations in Japan opened in 1990
Kashima, Ibaraki